Irving Marmer Copi (né Copilovich or Copilowish; July 28, 1917 – August 19, 2002) was an American philosopher, logician, and university textbook author.

Biography
Copi studied under Bertrand Russell while at the University of Chicago. In 1948 he contributed to the calculus of relations with his article using logical matrices.

Copi taught at the University of Illinois, the United States Air Force Academy, Princeton University, and the Georgetown University Logic Institute, before teaching logic at the University of Michigan, 1958–69, and at the University of Hawaii at Manoa, 1969–90.

Assigned to teach logic, Copi reviewed the available textbooks and decided to write his own. His manuscript was split into his Introduction to Logic (1953), and Symbolic Logic (1954). A reviewer noted that it had an "unusually comprehensive chapter on definition" and mentions that "the author accounts for the seductive nature of informal fallacies". The textbooks proved popular, and a reviewer of the third edition noted over 100 new exercises added. Both textbooks are widely used, with the former currently in its 14th edition.

Family
In 1941 Copi married Amelia Glaser. They had four children David, Thomas, William, and Margaret.

Books
 1953: Introduction to Logic. Macmillan.
 1954: Symbolic Logic. Macmillan.
 1958: Artificial Languages.
 1958: (with Elgot and Wright) Realization of Events with Logical Nets.
 1965: (edited with Paul Hente). Language, Thought and Culture. The University of Michigan Press.
 1966: (edited with Robert Beard) Essays on Wittgenstein's Tractatus.
 1967: (edited with James Gould) Contemporary Readings in Logical Theory. Macmillan.
 1971: The Theory of Logical Types, Routledge and Kegan Paul.
 1986: (with Keith Burgess-Jackson) Informal Logic, Macmillan.

Articles
 1953: "Analytical Philosophy and Analytical Propositions", Philosophical Studies 4(6): 87–93.
 1954: "Essence and Accident", Journal of Philosophy 51(23): 706–19.
 1956: "Another variant of Natural Deduction", Journal of Symbolic Logic 21(1): 52–5.
 1956: (with Arthur W. Burks) "The Logical Design of an Idealized General-Purpose Computer", Journal of the Franklin Institute 261: 299–314, and 421–36.
 1957: "Tractatus 5.542", Analysis 18(5): 102–4.
 1958: "The Burali-Forti Paradox", Philosophy of Science 25(4): 281–6.
 1963: (with Eric Stenius) "Wittgenstein’s Tractatus: A Critical Exposition of its Main Lines of Thought", Philosophical Review 72(3): 382.

References

External links

 Eliot Deutsch (2002): "Irving Copi, 1917-2002" from Bertrand Russell Society (also in Proceedings and Addresses of the American Philosophical Association 76(2): 125–6)
 Introduction to Logic at Goodreads

1917 births
2002 deaths
American logicians
20th-century American philosophers
University of Michigan faculty